Roy Callender (born October 31, 1944) is a Barbadian Canadian IFBB Hall of Famer retired professional bodybuilder, professional wrestler and actor.

Early life and career
Callender was born in Barbados to an academician couple. His interest in bodybuilding started by the age of 8 and after moving to England for studying law and from 1967, he began to compete, winning the title Mr Southeast Britain the same year. He became Mr. United Kingdom in 1968. After finishing second in the medium-height class in the NABBA Amateur Universe in 1967, 1969 and 1971, Callender moved to Canada where he won Mr. Canada contest. He retired from competitive bodybuilding afterwards and had a brief role in Dušan Makavejev's experimental black comedy Sweet Movie.

Professional wrestling
Callender started his professional wrestling career in 1974, making his ring debut against Killer Tim Brooks in Montreal. He was promoted with the gimmick "Mr. Universe" in his career and contracted to the promotion Stampede Wrestling, Callender retired by the end of the year 1976 at a match against Keith Hart in Calgary.

Return to bodybuilding
Callender contacted gym owner and photographer Jimmy Caruso to prepare him for a comeback to competitive bodybuilding and on 10 September 1977, Callender, competing for the first time since 1971, won the Canadian Championships in Calgary. He was the winner of the 1979 IFBB Pro Universe, edging out his compatriot Albert Beckles. After competing in Mr. Olympia events for four times and with varying success, he returned to Barbados in 1982. After his fifth Olympia in 1984, he had a hiatus of three years in his native country and after placing seventh at the IFBB Grand Prix in Essen, he retired in 1987.

Later career
Callender returned to Montreal by 1991. He now works as a Gold's Gym master trainer.

Competition history
1967
Mr Southeast Britain, Winner
Mr Universe - NABBA, Medium, 2nd

1968
Mr Southeast Britain, 2nd
Mr United Kingdom, Winner
Universe - IFBB, 6th
Mr World - IFBB, Medium, 2nd

1969
Mr Universe - NABBA, Medium, 2nd

1970
Mr World - IFBB, Medium, 2nd

1971
Mr Universe - NABBA, Medium, 2nd

1977
Canadian Championships - CBBF, Medium, 1st
Canadian Championships - CBBF, Overall Winner
Mr International - IFBB, HeavyWeight, 1st
Universe - IFBB, MiddleWeight, 1st

1978
Night of Champions - IFBB, 2nd
Olympia - IFBB, HeavyWeight, 2nd
Olympia - IFBB, 3rd
Professional World Cup - IFBB, 3rd
Universe - Pro - IFBB, Overall Winner

1979
Best in the World - IFBB, Professional, 2nd
Canada Diamond Pro Cup - IFBB, Winner
Canada Pro Cup - IFBB, Did not place
Florida Pro Invitational - IFBB, 6th
Grand Prix Pennsylvania - IFBB, 2nd
Grand Prix Vancouver - IFBB, Winner
Olympia - IFBB, HeavyWeight, 4th
Pittsburgh Pro Invitational - IFBB, 4th
Universe - Pro - IFBB, Winner
World Pro Championships - IFBB, Winner

1980
Grand Prix Pennsylvania - IFBB, 3rd
Night of Champions - IFBB, 3rd
Olympia - IFBB, 7th
Pittsburgh Pro Invitational - IFBB, 3rd

1981
Grand Prix California - IFBB, 2nd
Grand Prix Louisiana - IFBB, 3rd
Grand Prix Washington - IFBB, 2nd
Olympia - IFBB, 4th

1982
World Pro Championships - IFBB, 5th

1984
Olympia - IFBB, 5th

1987
Grand Prix Germany (2) - IFBB, 7th
Night of Champions - IFBB, Did not place
World Pro Championships - IFBB, 12th

Filmography

References

External links
Roy Callender competition history (incomplete)

1944 births
Living people
Canadian bodybuilders
Barbadian professional wrestlers
Canadian male professional wrestlers
Black Canadian sportspeople
Barbadian emigrants to Canada
Barbadian expatriates in the United Kingdom
Professional bodybuilders
Anglophone Quebec people
Stampede Wrestling alumni
Professional wrestlers from Montreal